Ernie Shaw (13 May 1908 – 5 November 1968) was a former Australian rules footballer who played with Melbourne in the Victorian Football League (VFL).

Notes

External links 

 Ernie Shaw at Demonwiki

1908 births
Australian rules footballers from Victoria (Australia)
Melbourne Football Club players
1968 deaths